The 2002–03 Los Angeles Kings season was the Kings' 36th season in the National Hockey League. The Kings failed to qualify for the playoffs for the first time since 1999, ending a three season playoff streak.

Offseason

Regular season
The Kings tied the Detroit Red Wings, New Jersey Devils and Washington Capitals for the fewest short-handed goals allowed, with just four.

Final standings

Schedule and results

|-  style="text-align:center; background:#cfc;"
|1||W||October 9, 2002||4–1 || style="text-align:left;"| Phoenix Coyotes (2002–03) ||1–0–0–0 || 
|-  style="text-align:center; background:#cfc;"
|2||W||October 12, 2002||3–2 || style="text-align:left;"| Detroit Red Wings (2002–03) ||2–0–0–0 || 
|-  style="text-align:center; background:#cfc;"
|3||W||October 16, 2002||4–2 || style="text-align:left;"| @ Mighty Ducks of Anaheim (2002–03) ||3–0–0–0 || 
|-  style="text-align:center; background:#fbb;"
|4||L||October 17, 2002||1–4 || style="text-align:left;"|  Colorado Avalanche (2002–03) ||3–1–0–0 || 
|- style="text-align:center;"
|5||T||October 19, 2002||2–2 OT|| style="text-align:left;"|  Vancouver Canucks (2002–03) ||3–1–1–0 || 
|- style="text-align:center;"
|6||T||October 23, 2002||3–3 OT|| style="text-align:left;"| @ Detroit Red Wings (2002–03) ||3–1–2–0 || 
|-  style="text-align:center; background:#cfc;"
|7||W||October 25, 2002||6–2 || style="text-align:left;"| @ New York Rangers (2002–03) ||4–1–2–0 || 
|-  style="text-align:center; background:#fbb;"
|8||L||October 27, 2002||1–5 || style="text-align:left;"| @ Columbus Blue Jackets (2002–03) ||4–2–2–0 || 
|-  style="text-align:center; background:#cfc;"
|9||W||October 29, 2002||4–0 || style="text-align:left;"| @ Atlanta Thrashers (2002–03) ||5–2–2–0 || 
|-  style="text-align:center; background:#FF6F6F;"
|10||OTL||October 31, 2002||1–2 OT|| style="text-align:left;"| @ Chicago Blackhawks (2002–03) ||5–2–2–1 || 
|-

|-  style="text-align:center; background:#cfc;"
|11||W||November 2, 2002||6–5 OT|| style="text-align:left;"|  Nashville Predators (2002–03) ||6–2–2–1 || 
|-  style="text-align:center; background:#fbb;"
|12||L||November 4, 2002||2–5 || style="text-align:left;"|  Minnesota Wild (2002–03) ||6–3–2–1 || 
|-  style="text-align:center; background:#fbb;"
|13||L||November 5, 2002||2–5 || style="text-align:left;"| @ San Jose Sharks (2002–03) ||6–4–2–1 || 
|-  style="text-align:center; background:#cfc;"
|14||W||November 8, 2002||3–2 || style="text-align:left;"| @ Ottawa Senators (2002–03) ||7–4–2–1 || 
|-  style="text-align:center; background:#fbb;"
|15||L||November 9, 2002||1–3 || style="text-align:left;"| @ Montreal Canadiens (2002–03) ||7–5–2–1 || 
|-  style="text-align:center; background:#FF6F6F;"
|16||OTL||November 12, 2002||3–4 OT|| style="text-align:left;"| @ Toronto Maple Leafs (2002–03) ||7–5–2–2 || 
|-  style="text-align:center; background:#fbb;"
|17||L||November 14, 2002||2–3 || style="text-align:left;"| @ Vancouver Canucks (2002–03) ||7–6–2–2 || 
|-  style="text-align:center; background:#cfc;"
|18||W||November 16, 2002||4–1 || style="text-align:left;"| @ Edmonton Oilers (2002–03) ||8–6–2–2 || 
|- style="text-align:center;"
|19||T||November 19, 2002||2–2 OT|| style="text-align:left;"| @ Minnesota Wild (2002–03) ||8–6–3–2 || 
|-  style="text-align:center; background:#FF6F6F;"
|20||OTL||November 21, 2002||2–3 OT|| style="text-align:left;"| @ St. Louis Blues (2002–03) ||8–6–3–3 || 
|-  style="text-align:center; background:#cfc;"
|21||W||November 23, 2002||2–0 || style="text-align:left;"|  Dallas Stars (2002–03) ||9–6–3–3 || 
|-  style="text-align:center; background:#fbb;"
|22||L||November 27, 2002||2–5 || style="text-align:left;"|  Florida Panthers (2002–03) ||9–7–3–3 || 
|- style="text-align:center;"
|23||T||November 29, 2002||2–2 OT|| style="text-align:left;"| @ Mighty Ducks of Anaheim (2002–03) ||9–7–4–3 || 
|-  style="text-align:center; background:#cfc;"
|24||W||November 30, 2002||4–1 || style="text-align:left;"|  Chicago Blackhawks (2002–03) ||10–7–4–3 || 
|-

|-  style="text-align:center; background:#fbb;"
|25||L||December 5, 2002||2–3 || style="text-align:left;"|  Nashville Predators (2002–03) ||10–8–4–3 || 
|-  style="text-align:center; background:#fbb;"
|26||L||December 7, 2002||2–4 || style="text-align:left;"|  Columbus Blue Jackets (2002–03) ||10–9–4–3 || 
|-  style="text-align:center; background:#cfc;"
|27||W||December 10, 2002||3–0 || style="text-align:left;"| @ Nashville Predators (2002–03) ||11–9–4–3 || 
|-  style="text-align:center; background:#cfc;"
|28||W||December 11, 2002||3–0 || style="text-align:left;"| @ Dallas Stars (2002–03) ||12–9–4–3 || 
|-  style="text-align:center; background:#cfc;"
|29||W||December 14, 2002||3–2 OT|| style="text-align:left;"|  Pittsburgh Penguins (2002–03) ||13–9–4–3 || 
|-  style="text-align:center; background:#fbb;"
|30||L||December 15, 2002||1–2 || style="text-align:left;"| @ Phoenix Coyotes (2002–03) ||13–10–4–3 || 
|-  style="text-align:center; background:#cfc;"
|31||W||December 17, 2002||6–2 || style="text-align:left;"|  St. Louis Blues (2002–03) ||14–10–4–3 || 
|-  style="text-align:center; background:#cfc;"
|32||W||December 19, 2002||5–4 || style="text-align:left;"|  Mighty Ducks of Anaheim (2002–03) ||15–10–4–3 || 
|-  style="text-align:center; background:#fbb;"
|33||L||December 22, 2002||1–3 || style="text-align:left;"| @ Chicago Blackhawks (2002–03) ||15–11–4–3 || 
|-  style="text-align:center; background:#fbb;"
|34||L||December 23, 2002||0–5 || style="text-align:left;"| @ St. Louis Blues (2002–03) ||15–12–4–3 || 
|-  style="text-align:center; background:#cfc;"
|35||W||December 26, 2002||4–3 OT|| style="text-align:left;"|  Phoenix Coyotes (2002–03) ||16–12–4–3 || 
|-  style="text-align:center; background:#fbb;"
|36||L||December 29, 2002||1–6 || style="text-align:left;"| @ Colorado Avalanche (2002–03) ||16–13–4–3 || 
|-  style="text-align:center; background:#fbb;"
|37||L||December 30, 2002||0–2 || style="text-align:left;"|  Chicago Blackhawks (2002–03) ||16–14–4–3 || 
|-

|-  style="text-align:center; background:#fbb;"
|38||L||January 2, 2003||1–4 || style="text-align:left;"|  Philadelphia Flyers (2002–03) ||16–15–4–3 || 
|-  style="text-align:center; background:#fbb;"
|39||L||January 4, 2003||2–3 || style="text-align:left;"|  Dallas Stars (2002–03) ||16–16–4–3 || 
|-  style="text-align:center; background:#cfc;"
|40||W||January 6, 2003||3–2 || style="text-align:left;"| @ Minnesota Wild (2002–03) ||17–16–4–3 || 
|-  style="text-align:center; background:#fbb;"
|41||L||January 7, 2003||4–7 || style="text-align:left;"| @ Dallas Stars (2002–03) ||17–17–4–3 || 
|-  style="text-align:center; background:#fbb;"
|42||L||January 9, 2003||4–5 || style="text-align:left;"|  Edmonton Oilers (2002–03) ||17–18–4–3 || 
|-  style="text-align:center; background:#fbb;"
|43||L||January 11, 2003||1–2 || style="text-align:left;"|  St. Louis Blues (2002–03) ||17–19–4–3 || 
|-  style="text-align:center; background:#cfc;"
|44||W||January 13, 2003||3–2 OT|| style="text-align:left;"|  San Jose Sharks (2002–03) ||18–19–4–3 || 
|-  style="text-align:center; background:#fbb;"
|45||L||January 16, 2003||0–2 || style="text-align:left;"| @ Edmonton Oilers (2002–03) ||18–20–4–3 || 
|-  style="text-align:center; background:#FF6F6F;"
|46||OTL||January 18, 2003||1–2 OT|| style="text-align:left;"| @ Calgary Flames (2002–03) ||18–20–4–4 || 
|-  style="text-align:center; background:#fbb;"
|47||L||January 22, 2003||5–6 || style="text-align:left;"| @ Mighty Ducks of Anaheim (2002–03) ||18–21–4–4 || 
|-  style="text-align:center; background:#fbb;"
|48||L||January 23, 2003||1–2 || style="text-align:left;"|  Minnesota Wild (2002–03) ||18–22–4–4 || 
|-  style="text-align:center; background:#cfc;"
|49||W||January 25, 2003||2–1 OT|| style="text-align:left;"|  New Jersey Devils (2002–03) ||19–22–4–4 || 
|-  style="text-align:center; background:#fbb;"
|50||L||January 27, 2003||0–3 || style="text-align:left;"|  San Jose Sharks (2002–03) ||19–23–4–4 || 
|-  style="text-align:center; background:#fbb;"
|51||L||January 28, 2003||1–3 || style="text-align:left;"| @ San Jose Sharks (2002–03) ||19–24–4–4 || 
|-  style="text-align:center; background:#cfc;"
|52||W||January 30, 2003||3–0 || style="text-align:left;"|  Ottawa Senators (2002–03) ||20–24–4–4 || 
|-

|-  style="text-align:center; background:#cfc;"
|53||W||February 5, 2003||4–3 || style="text-align:left;"|  Phoenix Coyotes (2002–03) ||21–24–4–4 || 
|-  style="text-align:center; background:#cfc;"
|54||W||February 7, 2003||8–2 || style="text-align:left;"|  Carolina Hurricanes (2002–03) ||22–24–4–4 || 
|-  style="text-align:center; background:#fbb;"
|55||L||February 9, 2003||1–3 || style="text-align:left;"| @ Dallas Stars (2002–03) ||22–25–4–4 || 
|-  style="text-align:center; background:#cfc;"
|56||W||February 11, 2003||3–2 || style="text-align:left;"| @ Nashville Predators (2002–03) ||23–25–4–4 || 
|-  style="text-align:center; background:#cfc;"
|57||W||February 13, 2003||4–2 || style="text-align:left;"|  Calgary Flames (2002–03) ||24–25–4–4 || 
|-  style="text-align:center; background:#fbb;"
|58||L||February 15, 2003||2–3 || style="text-align:left;"|  New York Islanders (2002–03) ||24–26–4–4 || 
|-  style="text-align:center; background:#cfc;"
|59||W||February 17, 2003||3–2 || style="text-align:left;"|  San Jose Sharks (2002–03) ||25–26–4–4 || 
|-  style="text-align:center; background:#fbb;"
|60||L||February 20, 2003||0–5 || style="text-align:left;"| @ Philadelphia Flyers (2002–03) ||25–27–4–4 || 
|-  style="text-align:center; background:#cfc;"
|61||W||February 21, 2003||4–1 || style="text-align:left;"| @ Buffalo Sabres (2002–03) ||26–27–4–4 || 
|-  style="text-align:center; background:#fbb;"
|62||L||February 24, 2003||4–5 || style="text-align:left;"| @ Detroit Red Wings (2002–03) ||26–28–4–4 || 
|-  style="text-align:center; background:#cfc;"
|63||W||February 25, 2003||5–3 || style="text-align:left;"| @ Pittsburgh Penguins (2002–03) ||27–28–4–4 || 
|-  style="text-align:center; background:#fbb;"
|64||L||February 27, 2003||1–3 || style="text-align:left;"| @ Columbus Blue Jackets (2002–03) ||27–29–4–4 || 
|-

|-  style="text-align:center; background:#cfc;"
|65||W||March 1, 2003||4–1 || style="text-align:left;"|  Atlanta Thrashers (2002–03) ||28–29–4–4 || 
|-  style="text-align:center; background:#fbb;"
|66||L||March 4, 2003||1–2 || style="text-align:left;"|  Mighty Ducks of Anaheim (2002–03) ||28–30–4–4 || 
|-  style="text-align:center; background:#fbb;"
|67||L||March 6, 2003||1–2 || style="text-align:left;"|  Edmonton Oilers (2002–03) ||28–31–4–4 || 
|-  style="text-align:center; background:#cfc;"
|68||W||March 8, 2003||2–1 || style="text-align:left;"|  Montreal Canadiens (2002–03) ||29–31–4–4 || 
|-  style="text-align:center; background:#fbb;"
|69||L||March 10, 2003||2–3 || style="text-align:left;"|  Detroit Red Wings (2002–03) ||29–32–4–4 || 
|-  style="text-align:center; background:#fbb;"
|70||L||March 12, 2003||2–4 || style="text-align:left;"| @ Tampa Bay Lightning (2002–03) ||29–33–4–4 || 
|-  style="text-align:center; background:#cfc;"
|71||W||March 14, 2003||3–1 || style="text-align:left;"| @ Washington Capitals (2002–03) ||30–33–4–4 || 
|- style="text-align:center;"
|72||T||March 15, 2003||0–0 OT|| style="text-align:left;"| @ Carolina Hurricanes (2002–03) ||30–33–5–4 || 
|-  style="text-align:center; background:#fbb;"
|73||L||March 18, 2003||1–4 || style="text-align:left;"|  Calgary Flames (2002–03) ||30–34–5–4 || 
|- style="text-align:center;"
|74||T||March 20, 2003||2–2 OT|| style="text-align:left;"|  Tampa Bay Lightning (2002–03) ||30–34–6–4 || 
|-  style="text-align:center; background:#FF6F6F;"
|75||OTL||March 22, 2003||3–4 OT|| style="text-align:left;"|  Boston Bruins (2002–03) ||30–34–6–5 || 
|-  style="text-align:center; background:#FF6F6F;"
|76||OTL||March 25, 2003||1–2 OT|| style="text-align:left;"|  Columbus Blue Jackets (2002–03) ||30–34–6–6 || 
|-  style="text-align:center; background:#fbb;"
|77||L||March 27, 2003||0–3 || style="text-align:left;"| @ Colorado Avalanche (2002–03) ||30–35–6–6 || 
|-  style="text-align:center; background:#fbb;"
|78||L||March 29, 2003||1–5 || style="text-align:left;"|  Vancouver Canucks (2002–03) ||30–36–6–6 || 
|-  style="text-align:center; background:#cfc;"
|79||W||March 31, 2003||5–4 OT|| style="text-align:left;"| @ Phoenix Coyotes (2002–03) ||31–36–6–6 || 
|-

|-  style="text-align:center; background:#cfc;"
|80||W||April 2, 2003||5–3 || style="text-align:left;"|  Colorado Avalanche (2002–03) ||32–36–6–6 || 
|-  style="text-align:center; background:#FF6F6F;"
|81||OTL||April 4, 2003||1–2 OT|| style="text-align:left;"| @ Calgary Flames (2002–03) ||32–36–6–7 || 
|-  style="text-align:center; background:#cfc;"
|82||W||April 6, 2003||2–0 || style="text-align:left;"| @ Vancouver Canucks (2002–03) ||33–36–6–7 || 
|-

|-
| Legend:

Player statistics

Scoring
 Position abbreviations: C = Center; D = Defense; G = Goaltender; LW = Left Wing; RW = Right Wing
  = Joined team via a transaction (e.g., trade, waivers, signing) during the season. Stats reflect time with the Kings only.
  = Left team via a transaction (e.g., trade, waivers, release) during the season. Stats reflect time with the Kings only.

Goaltending

Awards and records

Awards

Transactions
The Kings were involved in the following transactions from June 14, 2002, the day after the deciding game of the 2002 Stanley Cup Finals, through June 9, 2003, the day of the deciding game of the 2003 Stanley Cup Finals.

Trades

Players acquired

Players lost

Signings

Draft picks
Los Angeles's draft picks at the 2002 NHL Entry Draft held at the Air Canada Centre in Toronto, Ontario.

Notes

References

Los
Los
Los Angeles Kings seasons
LA Kings
LA Kings